Prison Bound is the second studio album by Social Distortion, released in 1988. It was the first album with bass guitarist John Maurer and drummer Christopher Reece. It expands the punk rock sound of the band's first album, Mommy's Little Monster (1983), by adding influences from country music and blues rock.

Social Distortion left then-independent Restless / Enigma Records in 1989 and moved to Epic Records for their major label debut self-titled album.

The first track, "It's the Law", is a remake of "Justice for All", which appeared on the 1981 compilation album The Future Looks Bright (and later on the 1995 compilation album Mainliner: Wreckage from the Past). The fifth track, "Prison Bound", was only released as a single on KROQ-FM. The album contains a cover version of "Backstreet Girl", originally recorded by the Rolling Stones. The album's title track contains a reference to Johnny Cash's "I Walk the Line".

Critical reception
Trouser Press wrote that "although Prison Bound lacks the all-out dynamics of Monster ... it’s still a maturely paced, knowing follow-up, and not just for punks." Nick Robinson, reviewer of British music newspaper Music Week, noted band's adulting in comparison with early recordings. He found there "upright bursts of aggression, frustration and depression tell a vivid tale of growing up and blues and country influences add depth to this blunt, honest and thrilling account".

Track listing

Personnel
 Mike Ness – lead vocal, lead guitar
 Dennis Danell – rhythm guitar
 John Maurer – bass guitar, backing vocals
 Christopher Reece – drums

References

Social Distortion albums
1988 albums
Time Bomb Recordings albums
Prison music